Eugénia Cândida da Fonseca da Silva Mendes (died 1843) was a Portuguese baroness and landowner. She was born to José António da Fonseca and Perpétua Maria Xavier, and married João da Silva Mendes. Da Silva Mendes was of considerable wealth, and was a notable landowner. She is known for her political activity, especially during the 1820s, when she was the main financier of the Portuguese Liberals.

References
 "Livro de Oiro da Nobreza", Domingos de Araújo Affonso e Ruy Dique Travassos Valdez, Lisboa: J. A. Telles da Sylva, 2.ª edição, 1988, Volume Terceiro, pp. 339 e 340
 Nobreza de Portugal e do Brasil", Direcção de Afonso Eduardo Martins Zúquete, Editorial Enciclopédia, 2.ª edição, Lisboa, 1989, Volume Terceiro, p. 384 e 385

1843 deaths
19th-century Portuguese people
Portuguese nobility
Portuguese landowners
19th-century landowners